Olympique de Marseille had their best season since the bribery affair burst in 1993, reaching the UEFA Cup final and only just being defeated by Bordeaux in the domestic championship. Laurent Blanc, Christophe Dugarry and Fabrizio Ravanelli were among the crucial players in the Marseille resurgence. When those players left, l'OM fell into pieces.

Players

First-team squad
Squad at end of season<ref></http://www.footballsquads.co.uk/france/1998-1999/div1/marseille.htm</ref>

Competitions

Division 1

League table

Results summary

Results by round

Matches

UEFA Cup

First round

Marseille won 6–2 on aggregate.

Second round

Marseille won 4–3 on aggregate.

Third round

Marseille won 3–2 on aggregate.

Quarter-finals

Marseille won 2–1 on aggregate.

Semi-final

Bologna 1–1 Marseille on aggregate. Marseille won on away goals.

Final

Top scorers

Division 1
  Florian Maurice 14
  Fabrizio Ravanelli 13
  Robert Pires 6
  Titi Camara 6
  Christophe Dugarry 4

References

Olympique de Marseille seasons
Marseille